The 2016 Oregon Republican presidential primary was held on May 17 in the U.S. state of Oregon as one of the Republican Party's primaries ahead of the 2016 presidential election.

On the same day, the Democratic Party held their Oregon primary and their Kentucky primary, while the Republican Party did not hold any other primaries on that day.

Oregon has always voted for the nominee of the Republican Party in every statewide primary since 1944, except in 1964.

Opinion polling

Results

See also
 2016 Oregon Democratic presidential primary

References

Oregon
Republican primary
2016
May 2016 events in the United States